Wei Pei-lan (24 August 1911 – 22 February 1986) was a Chinese educator and politician. She was among the first group of women elected to the Legislative Yuan in 1948.

Biography
Originally from Gangu County in Gansu province, Wei studied at Peking Normal University. She worked as a teacher and director of discipline at Lanzhou Girls' Normal School, before becoming headmistress of Gansu Pingliang Girls' Normal School.

She joined the Kuomintang and became a member of the executive committee of the Gansu provincial party, as well as chairing its women's committee. She was appointed to the Gansu Provincial Senate and was a Kuomintang candidate in the 1948 elections for the Legislative Yuan, in which she was elected to parliament. She relocated to Taiwan during the Chinese Civil War, where she remained a member of the Legislative Yuan until her death in 1986.

References

1911 births
Beijing Normal University alumni
Chinese schoolteachers
20th-century Chinese women politicians
Members of the Kuomintang
Members of the 1st Legislative Yuan
Members of the 1st Legislative Yuan in Taiwan
1986 deaths